Doncaster was launched on the River Thames in 1825. Early in her career she carried emigrants to Australia. She made other voyages to Van Diemen's Land and New South Wales, but also traded as a West Indiaman. She was wrecked on 17 July 1836 on the coast of South Africa while sailing from Île de France (Mauritius) to London under a license from the British East India Company (EIC).

Career
Doncaster first appeared in the volume of the Register of Shipping (RS), in 1825.<ref name=R1825>[https://hdl.handle.net/2027/mdp.39015024214283?urlappend=%3Bseq=171 '"RS (1825), "D" supple. pages.]</ref>Doncaster, Brown, master, sailed to Cork, and then on to Demerara, where she arrived on 19 April 1825. She arrived back at Gravesend on 15 August. She first appeared in Lloyd's Register (LR), in 1826.Doncaster, S.Brown, master was listed in Lloyd's Register as sailing for Van Diemen's Land (VDL) or New South Wales (NSW) on 5 December 1825. Lloyd's Lists ship arrival and departure (SAD) data showed Doncaster, Church, master, at Deal on 20 November, bound for New South Wales. Doncaster, Church, master, on her way to Van Diemen's Land, arrived at Cowes on 30 November with a broken rudder. She sailed for VDL on 5 December, or NSW on 6 December. On 28 December she sailed for VDL from Plymouth.Doncaster, John Foster Church, master, arrived at Hobart on 5 May 1826 with merchandise and 20 passengers. On 23 May Doncaster, Church, master, sailed from Hobart; she arrived at Port Jackson/Sydney on 29 May. One of her passengers was a distressed British subject that the British Consul at Santiago, Cape Verde had put on board when Doncaster had stopped there in January.

On 12 July Doncaster, Church, master, sailed for London, stopping at Hobart to take on cargo. She left Hobart on 10 October, Mrs. Church having given birth to a son while at Hobart. Doncaster arrived back at Gravesend.

In 1813 the EIC had lost its monopoly on the trade between India and Britain. British ships were then free to sail to India or the Indian Ocean under a licence from the EIC. Doncaster, Surflen, master, sailed from London on 3 February 1831, bound for Île de France and Ceylon.

FateDoncaster'', Pritchard, master, was wrecked on 17 July 1836 at the mouth of the Kleine River, South Africa. Another report stated that bodies and part of the wreckage had drifted ashore at Cape Agulhas. All 64 people on board were lost. She was on a voyage from Mauritius to London.

A later report had a casualty list. Passengers included civilians and troops being invalided home.

Notes, citations, and references
Notes

Citations

References
 

1825 ships
Ships built on the River Thames
Merchant ships of the United Kingdom
Age of Sail merchant ships
Maritime incidents in July 1836